Giorgio Bornacin (24 November 1949 – 17 March 2023) was an Italian politician. He was senator (1996–2001, 2006–2013) and deputy (2001–2006).

Bornacin died on 17 March 2023, at the age of 73.

References

1949 births
2023 deaths
20th-century Italian politicians
21st-century Italian politicians
Italian Social Movement politicians
National Alliance (Italy) politicians
The People of Freedom politicians
Deputies of Legislature XIII of Italy
Deputies of Legislature XIV of Italy
Deputies of Legislature XV of Italy
Deputies of Legislature XVI of Italy